Dyall is a surname. Notable people with this surname include:

 Franklin Dyall (1870–1950), English actor
 Karl Dyall (born 1967), Swedish actor
 Kenneth G. Dyall, chemist known for the Dyall Hamiltonian
 Mary Dyall, married name of Mary Merrall (1890-1973), English actress
 Sharon Dyall (born 1962), Swedish actor
 Valentine Dyall (1908–1985), English actor